The Metro Theatre (commonly the Metro) is a music venue located on George Street, in the city centre of Sydney, Australia. The venue was redeveloped, from two former cinemas, by property developer Leon Fink.

The foyer of the Metro, designed by leading Australian stage designer Brian Thomson, features a lightweight plastic replica of the Art Deco crystal chandelier which once hung in Regent Theatre which formerly stood opposite the Metro in George Street.

Acts who generally perform at the Metro usually are Heavy Metal music, indie-rock and alternative bands, often of international fame. It was the venue for the now-legendary Sydney concerts in 1995 by Jeff Buckley and a record seven sold out shows in a row over six days in 1996 by You Am I, among many others.

It has two separate performance spaces inside the building, the Forum (often simply called the Metro) and the Transit Lounge (which, in January 2007, was re-launched and re-branded as the Lair). Up until 2007 it was not uncommon for both spaces to be used on the same night for different acts, with the larger of the two, the Forum, generally hosting the more famous act. Since the launch of the Lair the space has seldom been used for a public performance, as its primary function was to house MTV Australia's the Lair live music programme.

For a brief period in the second half of 2006 the venue was known as the Century Theatre after it went into receivership and was acquired by Century Venues. It was changed back to the Metro Theatre by October 2006.

On 16 September 2009 the Metro was rebranded as the Virgin Mobile Metro, after a sponsorship deal had been made. Dappled Cities Fly and the Seabellies both played at the launch night on 29 September 2009.

Performing acts at the Metro, Sydney
A list of some of the more famous musical acts that have performed at the Metro:

Australian acts that have played there include:
 Sia
 The Vines
 The Smith Street Band
 Short Stack
 Angela's Dish
 You Am I
 Eskimo Joe
 Pete Murray and the Stonemasons
 Alex Lloyd
 Spiderbait August 2014
 Something for Kate
 Gyroscope
 Sugar Army
 Young and Restless
 Angelspit
 Mortal Sin
 5 Seconds of Summer
 360
 Safia
 Jet
 Parkway Drive
 Thy Art Is Murder
 Polaris
 Psycroptic
 Sam Fischer

References

External links
Official website
Virgin Mobile Metro press release
MTV The Lair official website
Century Venues official website

Theatres in Sydney